The environmental effects of Bitcoin are considerable. One such environmental effect is that it worsens climate change. This is because bitcoins are made using electricity partially generated by gas and coal-fired power plants. When burned, coal and natural gas emit greenhouse gases, which heat the Earth and change the climate. , such bitcoin mining is estimated to be responsible for 0.1% of world greenhouse gas emissions. A second environmental effect is the air pollution caused by coal-fired electricity generation, and a third is the e-waste due to the short life expectancy of bitcoin-mining equipment.

Bitcoin is a cryptocurrency made by proof-of-work, while some other cryptocurrencies, such as Ethereum, are made by proof-of-stake, which consumes less electricity. , the Cambridge Centre for Alternative Finance (CCAF) estimates that Bitcoin consumes around  annually, and says bitcoin mining uses about as much electricity as Egypt. But it is difficult to find out how the electricity used for mining was generated, and thus Bitcoin's carbon footprint. One study found that from 2016 to 2021, each US dollar worth of bitcoin mined caused 35 cents worth of climate damage, comparable to the beef industry and the gasoline industry.

As of 2021, Bitcoin's annual e-waste is estimated to be over 30,000 tonnes, which is comparable to the small IT equipment waste produced by the Netherlands. Creating one bitcoin generates  of e-waste. The average lifespan of bitcoin-mining devices is estimated to be about 1.3 years. Unlike most computing hardware, the used application-specific integrated circuits have no alternative use beyond bitcoin mining.

Reducing Bitcoin's environmental effects is difficult; possible remedies include making bitcoin only where or when there is excess clean electricity. Some policymakers have called for further restrictions or bans on bitcoin mining.

Bitcoin energy consumption 

, the Cambridge Centre for Alternative Finance (CCAF) estimates that Bitcoin consumes  annually, representing 0.29% of the world's energy production and 0.59% of the world's electricity production, ranking Bitcoin mining between Ukraine and Egypt in terms of electricity consumption.

George Kamiya, writing for the International Energy Agency, said that "predictions about Bitcoin consuming the entire world's electricity" were sensational, but that the area "requires careful monitoring and rigorous analysis". One study in 2021 by cryptocurrency investment firm Galaxy Digital claimed that Bitcoin mining used less energy than the banking system, with Galaxy Digital later clarifying that bitcoin mining's energy usage is not correlated with its "transactional volume or throughput" as it is in banking.

Sources of energy 

Until 2021, according to the CCAF, much of the mining for Bitcoin was done in China. Chinese miners relied on cheap coal power in Xinjiang in late autumn, winter and spring, and then migrated to regions with overcapacities in low-cost hydropower, like Sichuan, between May and October. In June 2021 China banned bitcoin mining and the miners moved to other countries. By December 2021, the global computational capacity had mostly recovered to a level before China's crackdown, with more mining being done in the U.S. (35.4%), Kazakhstan (18.1%), and Russia (11%) instead. Coal power plants in Kazakhstan generate most of the country’s electricity and emit lots of local air pollution.

Greenidge Generation, a natural gas coal power plant in Dresden, New York, had originally been built for coal and had shut down in 2011 due to lack of demand. The plant reactivated in 2016 as a natural gas plant but failed to find sufficient demand. It switched entirely to bitcoin mining in 2019. In addition to emitting around 220,000 tonnes of carbon dioxide in 2020, the plant's cooling intake and discharge of heated water into Seneca Lake coincided with a significant decrease in fish and other wildlife populations. In 2022, the plant's air permit request was denied by the New York State Department of Environmental Conservation (DEC).

As of September 2021, according to the New York Times, Bitcoin's use of renewables ranged from 40% to 75%. Experts and government authorities have suggested that the use of renewable energy for mining may limit the availability of clean energy for ordinary uses by the general population.

Negative effect of mining

Bitcoin carbon emissions 
Concerns about Bitcoin's environmental effects relate the network's energy consumption to carbon emissions. The difficulty of translating energy consumption into carbon emissions is due to the way bitcoin mining is distributed, making it difficult for researchers to identify miner's location and electricity use. The results of studies into Bitcoin's carbon footprint vary. According to studies published in Joule and American Chemical Society in 2019, Bitcoin's annual energy consumption results in annual carbon emission ranging from 17 to 22.9 Mt which is comparable to the level of emissions of countries as Jordan and Sri Lanka.

In September 2022, a report in the journal Scientific Reports found that from 2016 to 2021, each US dollar worth of mined bitcoin market value also caused 35 cents worth of climate damage. This is comparable to the beef industry which causes 33 cents per dollar, and the gasoline industry which causes 41 cents per dollar. Compared to gold mining, "Bitcoin's climate damage share is nearly an order of magnitude higher" according to study co-author economist Andrew Goodkind.

Electronic waste 

Bitcoins annual e-waste is estimated to be over 30,000 tonnes as of May 2021, which is comparable to the small IT equipment waste produced by the Netherlands. One bitcoin generates  of e-waste per transaction. Due to the consistent increase of the Bitcoin network's hashrate, mining devices are estimated to have an average lifespan of 1.29 years until they become unprofitable and need to be replaced. Unlike most computing hardware the used application-specific integrated circuits have no alternative use beyond bitcoin mining.

Alternative energy usage  
The development of intermittent renewable energy sources, such as wind power and solar power, is challenging because they cause instability in the electrical grid. Several papers concluded that these renewable power stations could use the surplus energy to mine Bitcoin and thereby reduce curtailment, hedge electricity price risk, stabilize the grid, increase the profitability of renewable energy infrastructure, and therefore accelerate transition to sustainable energy and decrease Bitcoin's carbon footprint.

The Mechanicville Hydroelectric Plant in New York State and three hydroelectric power plants in San Pedro de Poás, Costa Rica have reactivated to mine cryptocurrency. According to the owners of the Mechanicville plant, the mining prevented the plant from being dismantled.

Responses

A survey on technologies approached cryptocurrencies' technological and environmental issues from many perspectives and noted the plans of using the methods of unconventional computing and grid computing to make Bitcoin both greener and more justified.

Per a 2021 study in Finance Research Letters, "climate-related criticism of Bitcoin is primarily based on the network's absolute carbon emissions, without considering its market value." It argues that the inclusion of Bitcoin in an equity portfolio reduces that portfolio's "aggregate carbon emissions".

Policy to move from proof of work to proof of stake has been compared to policy to move from fossil-fueled to electric cars, with some calling for a ban on PoW.

Bitcoin developers are working on the Lightning Network. The aim is to reduce the energy demand of the network by moving most transactions off the blockchain.

Some papers have suggested that cryptocurrencies and other blockchain applications might encourage a transition to a circular economy. For example, token reward models could be used to incentivize individuals to recycle.

References

Further reading

Economics and climate change
Bitcoin